The  is a 18.713 km long undersea railway tunnel under the Kanmon Straits connecting Shin-Shimonoseki Station and Kokura Station.

At the time of opening in March of 1975, it was the longest railway tunnel in Japan before being overtaken by in 1988 the opening of the Seikan Tunnel. It is also the longest tunnel section on the entire Sanyo/Tokaido Shinkansen line.

Overview 
 Starting point: Ichinomiya Gakuencho, Shimonoseki City, Yamaguchi Prefecture
 End point: 2-chome, Shimotomino, Kokurakita-ku, Kitakyūshū, Fukuoka
 Overall Length: 
 Undersea bed section: 
 Below sea level section: 
 Tunnel gradient: 18/1000
 Track gauge: 1,435 mm
 Electrification: 25 kV AC, 60 Hz, overhead catenary

The construction of the new tunnel started as a project to connect Honshu and Kyushu with a high-speed railway. The tunnel was constructed at the shortest section in the Kanmon Strait between Dannoura, Shimonoseki City - Mekari, Mojiku, Kitakyushu.

This is the only 1000 km railway marker in Japan.

Coordinates
 Shimonoseki entrance: 
 Moji entrance:

References 

Railway tunnels in Japan
Undersea tunnels in Asia
West Japan Railway Company
Sanyō Shinkansen